2nd "Carmeli" Brigade (Hebrew: חטיבת כרמלי, Hativat Carmeli, former 165th Brigade) is a reserve infantry brigade of the Israel Defense Forces, part of the Northern Command. Today the brigade consists of four battalions, including one reconnaissance battalion. The brigade is made up of soldiers who have completed their mandatory service in the 13th (Gideon) Battalion of the Golani Brigade.

The brigade was formed on February 22, 1948 during the 1948 Arab–Israeli War, when the Levanoni Brigade in the Galilee split into the 1st Golani Brigade and the 2nd Carmeli Brigade. In its early days the brigade gained control over three battalions – the 21st, 22nd and 23rd – although, later during the war the 24th battalion was also established. It has since participated in all of Israel's major wars and nearly all major operations, including the Sinai War, Six-Day War, War of Attrition, Yom Kippur War, Operation Litani, the first and second wars in Lebanon, and various operations during the Palestinian intifadas.

Brigades of Israel